Phymatopus hectica is a species of moth belonging to the family Hepialidae. It was described by Otto Bang-Haas in 1927, and is known from Russia (the Russian Far East and Siberia).

References

Hepialidae
Moths described in 1927
Taxa named by Otto Bang-Haas